Kafiabad may refer to:
 Kafiabad, Yazd